The following is a list of episodes for the British sitcom The Green Green Grass, that aired on BBC One from 9 September 2005 to 5 March 2009.

Series overview

Episodes

Series 1 (2005)

Series 2 (2006)

Series 3 (2007)

Series 4 (2009)

Ratings

References

External links
The Green Green Grass BBC Comedy Guide
The Green Green Grass British Sitcom Guide
The Green Green Grass
The Green Green Grass Only Fools and Horses

Lists of British sitcom episodes
 List